was the tenth vessel to be commissioned in the 19-vessel  destroyers built for the Imperial Japanese Navy in the late-1930s under the Circle Three Supplementary Naval Expansion Program (Maru San Keikaku).

Background 
The Kagerō-class destroyers were outwardly almost identical to the preceding , with improvements made by Japanese naval architects to improve stability and to take advantage of Japan’s lead in torpedo technology. They were designed to accompany the Japanese main striking force and in both day and night attacks against the United States Navy as it advanced across the Pacific Ocean, according to Japanese naval strategic projections. Despite being one of the most powerful classes of destroyers in the world at the time of their completion, only one survived the Pacific War.

Their crew numbered 240 officers and enlisted men. The ships had two Kampon geared steam turbines, each driving one propeller shaft, using steam provided by three Kampon water-tube boilers.

The main armament of the Kagerō class consisted of six Type 3  guns in three twin-gun turrets, one superfiring pair aft and one turret forward of the superstructure. They were built with four Type 96  anti-aircraft guns in two twin-gun mounts, but more of these guns were added over the course of the war. The ships were also armed with eight  torpedo tubes for the oxygen-fueled Type 93 "Long Lance" torpedo in two quadruple traversing mounts; one reload was carried for each tube. Their anti-submarine weapons comprised 16 depth charges.

Construction and career 
 Tokitsukaze was laid down on 20 February 1939 at the Uraga Dock Company. The ship was launched on 10 November 1939 and commissioned on 15 December 1940.

At the time of the attack on Pearl Harbor, Tokitsukaze, was assigned to Destroyer Division 16 (Desdiv 16), and a member of Destroyer Squadron 2 (Desron 2) of the IJN 2nd Fleet, and had deployed from Palau, as part of the escort for the aircraft carrier  in the invasion of the southern Philippines.

In early 1942, Tokitsukaze participated in the invasion of the Netherlands East Indies, escorting the invasion forces for Menado, Kendari and Ambon in January, and the invasion forces for Timor and eastern Java in February. On 27–26 February, she participated in the Battle of the Java Sea, taking part in a torpedo attack on the Allied fleet. During the month of March, Desron 2 was engaged in anti-submarine operations in the Java Sea. At the end of the month, Tokitsukaze deployed from Ambon for the invasion of Western New Guinea. At the end of April, she returned to Kure Naval Arsenal for repairs, docking on 2 May.

On 21 May 1942, Tokitsukaze and Desron 2 steamed from Kure to Saipan, where they rendezvoused with a troop convoy and sailed toward Midway Island. Due to the defeat of the Carrier Striking Force and loss of four fleet carriers in the Battle of Midway, the invasion was called off and the convoy withdrew without seeing combat. Desdiv 16 was ordered back to Kure. On 14 July, Tokitsukaze was reassigned to the IJN 3rd Fleet and was assigned to escort the transport  Nankai Maru to Rabaul, returning with the cruiser  to Kure in mid-August. Tokitsukaze returned to the Solomon Islands before the end of the month, in time to participate in the Battle of the Eastern Solomons on 24 August, as an escort to Ryūjō and the cruiser . After the battle, she assisted in the rescue of the survivors from Ryūjō and spent the month of September on patrols based out of Truk. She escorted the damaged carrier  to Kure for repairs in mid-October.

During the Battle of Santa Cruz Islands on 26 October, she was part of Admiral Nagumo’s Strike Force.

After redeploying to Shortland Island, on 10 January, while providing cover for a supply-drum transport run to Guadalcanal, Tokitsukaze assisted in sinking the American PT boats PT-43 and PT-112. Through the end of February, she continued to be used as a high speed transport in the evacuation of Japanese forces from Guadalcanal.

During the Battle of Bismarck Sea on 3 March 1943, Tokitsukaze was damaged by an Allied air attack, which killed 19 crewmen and left her dead in the water. Her skipper, Cdr Masayoshi Motokura, gave the order to abandon ship, and the survivors were taken aboard the destroyer . The abandoned vessel was discovered southeast of Finschhafen and sunk by Allied aircraft the following morning at coordinates.

She was removed from the navy list on 1 April 1943.

See also 
 List of ships of the Japanese Navy

Notes

Books

External links 
 CombinedFleet.com: Kagero-class destroyers.
 CombinedFleet.com: Tabular Record of Movement of Tokitsukaze.

Kagerō-class destroyers
World War II destroyers of Japan
Shipwrecks in the Solomon Sea
World War II shipwrecks in the Pacific Ocean
1939 ships
Ships built by Uraga Dock Company
Maritime incidents in March 1943
Destroyers sunk by aircraft